The 1935 New Brunswick general election was held on June 27, 1935, to elect 48 members to the 38th New Brunswick Legislative Assembly, the governing house of the province of New Brunswick, Canada. The incumbent Conservative government of Leonard Percy de Wolfe Tilley was defeated.

References

Further reading
 

1935 elections in Canada
Elections in New Brunswick
1935 in New Brunswick
June 1935 events